Garret Hostel Bridge, colloquially known as Orgasm Bridge, is a foot and cycle bridge over the River Cam in Cambridge, England. 

Garret Hostel Bridge is the tenth bridge overall and the sixth bridge over the River Cam's middle stream in Cambridge.

The bridge is at the end of Garret Hostel Lane, which was named after a building that that was acquired in 1329 by Michaelhouse, a former college of the university.  Hostel was demolished in the 17th century.
 
The first bridge was constructed in 1455. The current bridge was designed by Timothy Guy Morgan around 1960 when an undergraduate at the University of Cambridge's School of Architecture. Garret Hostel Bridge is one of three public bridges that link the city centre to The Backs; the other two are Silver Street Bridge and Magdalene Bridge.

See also
List of bridges in Cambridge
Template:River Cam map

References

Arch bridges in England
Bridges in Cambridge
Bridges across the River Cam
Concrete bridges in England
Pedestrian bridges in England